The following is the list of Finnish noble families, that have been introduced to the Finnish House of Nobility. There are 357 such families, of which 148 still are alive. Still existing families include four with title of count and 25 with title of baron. The remaining 119 families belong to untitled nobility.

Families
(A) untitled nobility, (F) Friherre (baron), (G) Greve (count), (R) Ruhtinas (prince)

References

 
 
Finnish noble
Finnish noble families